Denis Ménochet (born 18 September 1976) is a French actor. Ménochet is known to international audiences for his role as Perrier LaPadite, a French dairy farmer interrogated by the Nazis for harboring Jews in the 2009 Quentin Tarantino film Inglourious Basterds. In 2023, he won the Goya Award for Best Actor for The Beasts.

Career

Elizabeth Weitzman, a film critic for New York Daily News, praised Ménochet's work opposite Christoph Waltz in the opening scene of Inglourious Basterds. Weitzman wrote in August 2009, "The terrific opening, for example, does feature a hailstorm of bullets. What you'll remember best, though, is the haunted silence of actor Denis Ménochet, playing a French farmer accused of harboring Jews."

In 2018, Ménochet appeared as Daniel in the film Mary Magdalene, written by Helen Edmundson.

In 2022, Ménochet co-starred opposite Zar Amir Ebrahimi in the thriller White Paradise, directed by Guillaume Renusson.

Filmography

Accolades

References

External links

 
 
 
 Denis Ménochet at Cineuropa

1976 births
Living people
People from Enghien-les-Bains
French male film actors
French male television actors
21st-century French male actors
Best Actor Goya Award winners
Most Promising Actor Lumières Award winners
Chevaliers of the Ordre des Arts et des Lettres
Outstanding Performance by a Cast in a Motion Picture Screen Actors Guild Award winners